WCBC may refer to:

Boat Clubs:
 Wadham College Boat Club, the rowing club of Wadham College, Oxford University, England
 Wolfson College Boat Club (Cambridge), the rowing club of Wolfson College, Cambridge, England
 Worcester College Boat Club, the rowing club of Worcester College, Oxford, England

Colleges:
 West Coast Baptist College, an Independent Fundamental Baptist Bible college in Lancaster, California

Radio Stations:
 WCBC (AM), a radio station broadcasting at 1270 kHz on the AM band, licensed to Cumberland, Maryland
 WCBC-FM, a radio station broadcasting at 107.1 MHz on the FM band, licensed to Keyser, West Virginia